Reg District may refer to:
Reg District (Helmand), Afghanistan
Reg District (Kandahar), Afghanistan

District name disambiguation pages